New Zealand's exclusive economic zone (EEZ) covers at least , which is approximately 15 times the land area of the country. Sources vary significantly on the size of New Zealand's EEZ; for example, a recent government publication gave the area as roughly 4,300,000 km2. These figures are for the EEZ of New Zealand proper, and do not include the EEZs of other associated states and territories in the Realm of New Zealand (the Cook Islands, Niue, the Ross Dependency, and Tokelau).

See also
 Australia–New Zealand Maritime Treaty
 Coastline of New Zealand

References

Economy of New Zealand
New Zealand
Borders of New Zealand